Fernando Torres Andacht is a Uruguayan-born semiotician.

Andacht studied Letters at the University of the Republic, graduating in 1978. Afterwards he obtained an MA in General Linguistics at Ohio University (1981), a Doctorate in Latin American Studies at the University of Bergen, Norway (1998) and a PhD in Communication and Information, Universidade Federal do Rio Grande do Sul, Porto Alegre (2001). Currently he is a Member of the Faculty of Graduate and Postdoctoral Studies at the University of Ottawa.

Works
 

 
 A Semiotic Reflection on Selfinterpretation and Identity
 A Semiotic Framework for the Social Imaginary
 On the Relevance of the Imagination in the Semiotic of C. S. Peirce

References

External links
  

University of the Republic (Uruguay) alumni
Ohio University alumni
University of Bergen alumni
Federal University of Rio Grande do Sul alumni
Academic staff of the University of Ottawa
Semioticians

ddfb